Hercules Against the Sons of the Sun  (also known as Hercules Vs. the Sons of the Sun) is a 1964 Italian-Spanish peplum film written and directed by Osvaldo Civirani.

Cast 

Mark Forest as Hercules
 Anna Maria Pace as  Yamira
Giuliano Gemma as  Maytha
Giulio Donnini as  the High Priest
Franco Fantasia as  King Ata Hualpa 
 Angela Rhu as the Queen
Assia Zezon as the Handmaiden
Audrey Anderson as the Dancing Girl
Rosalba Neri as the Queen (uncredited)

Reception
A review in the Monthly Film Bulletin described the film as a "decorative film" that was "often pleasant to watch, with attractive outdoor locations featuring the most viridian of luxuriant foliage." and "an array of spectacular costumes" concluding that "its decorative virtues are the film's only strong point: it is totally lacking in vitality, and the stiff acting is not improved by equally stiff dubbing".

References

External links

 

1964 films
Peplum films
Films about Heracles
Films directed by Osvaldo Civirani
Films set in pre-Columbian America
Films scored by Lallo Gori
Sword and sandal films
1960s Italian films